"She Don't Know She's Beautiful" is a song written by Paul Harrison and Bob McDill, and recorded by American country music singer Sammy Kershaw. It was released in February 1993 as the first single from his album, Haunted Heart and became Kershaw's only Number One hit as it was number one in Canada and the United States.The song reached the top of the Billboard Hot Country Singles & Tracks chart. It also peaked at number 19 on the Billboard Bubbling Under Hot 100, making it a minor crossover hit.

Content
The narrator talks about how his significant other doesn't realize how beautiful she is, even with all the times he tells her.

Chart performance
The song debuted at number 67 on the Hot Country Songs chart dated February 13, 1993. It charted for 20 weeks on that chart, and reached Number One on the chart dated April 24, 1993, becoming Kershaw's only Number One hit in the United States and Canada.

Charts

Year-end charts

References

1993 singles
1993 songs
Sammy Kershaw songs
Songs written by Bob McDill
Song recordings produced by Buddy Cannon
Song recordings produced by Norro Wilson
Mercury Records singles